Don Nicolson (born 5 November 1939) is a former Australian rules footballer who played with Essendon in the Victorian Football League (VFL). Nicolson returned to his original club, Colac, after one season with Essendon. In 1963, he won the Hampden Football League best and fairest. Nicolson was later captain-coach of South Colac before coming back to Colac in the 1970s in the positions of under-18s coach and club president.

Notes

External links 
		

Essendon Football Club past player profile

1939 births
Living people
Australian rules footballers from Victoria (Australia)
Essendon Football Club players
Colac Football Club players